The 2022 season was the 15th season for the Indian Premier League franchise Kolkata Knight Riders (KKR). They were one of the ten teams that competed in the 2022 Indian Premier League. The franchise qualified for the IPL playoffs for the first time in 2011 and won the tournament in 2012 and 2014. The franchise also qualified for the playoffs in the three consecutive years of 2016, 2017 and 2018 as well as in 2021 when they were 3rd runners up.

Background
The team retained four players from the 2021 season ahead of the 2022 mega-auction.
Retained Andre Russell, Varun Chakaravarthy, Venkatesh Iyer, Sunil Narine
Acquired during the auction Nitish Rana, Pat Cummins, Shreyas Iyer, Shivam Mavi, Sheldon Jackson, Ajinkya Rahane, Rinku Singh, Anukul Roy, Rasikh Dar, Baba Indrajith, Chamika Karunaratne, Abhijeet Tomar, Pratham Singh, Ashok Sharma, Sam Billings, Alex Hales, Tim Southee, Ramesh Kumar, Mohammad Nabi, Umesh Yadav, Aman Khan

Squad 
 Players with international caps are listed in bold.
Squad strength: 25 (17 - Indian, 8 - overseas)

Administration and support staff

Kit manufacturers and sponsors

|

Teams and standings

Results by match

Point Table

Fixtures

Statistics

Most runs

 Source: https://www.iplt20.com/stats/

Most wickets

 Source: https://www.iplt20.com/stats/

References

Kolkata Knight Riders seasons
2022 Indian Premier League